Furona Island is a small island off the coast of Santa Isabel Island in the Solomon Islands.

Its only village, also called Furona, is home to speakers of the Bughotu language.

References

Islands of the Solomon Islands